CAMPOST is the company responsible for postal service in Cameroon.

It offers postal products, banking services and business services including server hosting, videoconferencing and IP phone services.

It has been a member of the Universal Postal Union since 26 July 1960. CAMPOST is regulated by the Agence de régulation des marchés publics (ARMP).

Creation
CAMPOST is a public postal enterprise created by presidential decree in April 2004. As of 1 January 2007, the state of Cameroon was the sole shareholder. Since 2007, CAMPOST is managed by the Canadian company Tecsult International Limited, responsible for cleaning up its management. The Cameroon Postal Services is placed under the technical supervision of the Ministry of Posts and Telecommunications and under the financial supervision of the Ministry of Finance.

18th Anniversary : 23 April 2022

CAMPOST does the following:
 Builds and operates postal networks and services.
 Provides postal financial services.
 Promotes national savings.
 Offers money transfer services.
 Provides insurance and estate management services

Products and services
The Cameroon Postal Services offers several products and services to its different targets. They can be grouped under postal products, financial and "innovative products".

Local

References 

Communications in Cameroon
Logistics companies of Cameroon
Cameroon